Cristóvão João Swingue (born 11 November 1976 in Luanda) is an Angolan  former basketball player. Swingue, a 6' 10" point guard, played for Angola at the 1999 AfroBasket. On the club level, he played for Petro Atlético and Primeiro de Agosto.

References

1977 births
Living people
Angolan men's basketball players
Basketball players from Luanda
Point guards
Atlético Petróleos de Luanda basketball players
C.D. Primeiro de Agosto men's basketball players
G.D. Interclube men's basketball players